Marcel Müller (born 7 September 1972) is a retired Swiss football midfielder.

References

1972 births
Living people
Swiss men's footballers
FC Wil players
FC Vaduz players
Swiss expatriate footballers
Swiss expatriate sportspeople in Liechtenstein
Expatriate footballers in Liechtenstein
FC Balzers players
Association football midfielders
Swiss Super League players